The 2005 Super League (Liga Super 2005) also known as the TM Liga Super for sponsorship reasons is the second season of the Liga Super, the top-tier professional football league in Malaysia.

Summary
The season was held from 29 January and concluded in 9 July 2005. The Liga Super champions for 2005 was Perlis. Perlis won the title after leaving the defending champions a huge 10 points behind. Penang escaped relegation on goal difference, having let in 4 goals less than Public Bank. The top goalscorer award was jointly won by Zacharia Simukonda from Perlis and Júlio César Rodrigues from Sabah. Both players scored 18 goals each. The highest number of goals featured in a match throughout the season was six. Four matches ended with six goals. The end of the season was marred by turmoil after Public Bank announced it would pulled out from the League, having been relegated. The team was eventually banned from all FAM competitions for five years.

Team

Changes from last season
Promoted from the 2004 Malaysia Premier League
 MPPJ
 TM

Relegated to the 2005 Malaysia Premier League
 Sarawak
 Kedah

Stadiums and locations

Note: Table lists in alphabetical order.

League table

Result table

Round 1–14

Round 15–21

Season statistics

Top scorers

References

Malaysia Super League seasons
1
Malay
Malay